Ana María Noé (1914 – 9 July 1970) was a Spanish actress.

Biography
Ana María Noé began her artistic career in Barcelona and began to gain prominence after the Spanish Civil War.

She debuted in the cinema and acted in 20 films, some of them Spaghetti Westerns in the 1960s.

Filmography

References

External links
 

1914 births
1970 deaths
20th-century Spanish actresses
People from Palma de Mallorca
Spanish film actresses
Spanish television actresses
Spanish stage actresses